The  is a professional wrestling championship in the Japanese promotion DDT Pro-Wrestling. The title was established in 2019 by Super Sasadango Machine in order to provide a title for wrestlers over 40 years old. , there have been a total of three reigns held between three different champions and a vacancy.

Title history

See also
IWGP U-30 Championship
Professional wrestling in Japan

References

External links
 O-40 Championship

DDT Pro-Wrestling championships
Openweight wrestling championships